(Robert) Charles Swanton  is British physician scientist specialising in oncology and cancer research. Swanton is a senior group leader at London's Francis Crick Institute, Royal Society Napier Professor in Cancer and thoracic medical oncologist at University College London and University College London Hospitals, co-director of the Cancer Research UK (CRUK) Lung Cancer Centre of Excellence, and Chief Clinician of Cancer Research UK.

Education
Swanton completed was educated at St Paul's School, London and completed his PhD in 1999 at what was then the Imperial Cancer Research Fund Laboratories (now the Francis Crick Institute) and his Cancer Research UK clinician scientist/medical oncology training in 2008.

Research and career

Swanton combines his laboratory research with clinical duties as co-director of the CRUK Lung Cancer Centre, focussed on how tumours evolve over space and time. He has helped to define the branched evolutionary histories of solid tumours, processes that drive cancer cell-to-cell variation in the form of new cancer mutations or chromosomal instabilities, and the impact of such cancer diversity on effective immune surveillance and clinical outcome.

Swanton is a co-founder of Achilles Therapeutics with Sergio Quezada, Karl Peggs and Mark Lowdell. Achilles Therapeutics is a UCL/CRUK and Francis Crick Institute biotechnology company funded by Syncona that develops adoptive T cell therapies targeting clonal/truncal neo-antigens present in every tumour cell to limit drug resistance and tumour evolution.

Awards and honours
 1997: Imperial Cancer Research Fund's (ICRF) Pontecorvo PhD thesis prize
 2011: Fellow of the Royal College of Physicians (FRCP)
 2014: Jeremy Jass Prize in pathology
 2015: Fellow of the Academy of Medical Sciences (FMedSci)
 2015: Stand up to Cancer Translational Cancer Research Prize
 2016: Glaxo Smithkline Biochemical Society Prize
 2016: San Salvatore prize for Cancer Research
 2017: CRUK Translational Research Prize in 2017,
 2017: EMBO Member in 2017
 2017: Ellison-Cliffe Medal by the Royal Society of Medicine
 2018: Elected a Fellow of the Royal Society (FRS)
 2018: Massachusetts General Hospital Cancer Centre Kraft Prize
 2018: Gordon Hamilton Fairley Medal and Lecture
2019: ESMO Translational Research Award
2020: Addario Lung Cancer Foundation Award and Lecture
2021: Weizmann Institute - Sergio Lambroso Award in Cancer Research
2021: Paul Marks Prize for Cancer Research

Personal life
Swanton is the son of Robert Howard Swanton (MD, FRCP) a consultant cardiologist at UCL.

References

1972 births
Living people
People educated at St Paul's School, London
Alumni of University College London
British oncologists
Fellows of the Royal Society
Fellows of the Academy of Medical Sciences (United Kingdom)
Fellows of the Royal College of Physicians
Members of the European Molecular Biology Organization